Henderson Winfield Da Costa Springer (born April 27, 1964, Bishops Hill, St Lucy, Barbados) was a Barbadian cricketer.

He played 26 first class and 31 List A matches as a right-handed batsman and a right-arm offbreak bowler. He played mainly for Barbados as well as Western Transvaal between 1987 and 1998.

He was coach of the West Indies ‘A’ team in 2006 and assistant coach of West Indies national cricket team in 2007.

References

External links
Cricinfo player profile

Living people
1964 births
Barbadian expatriate sportspeople in South Africa
Barbados cricketers
Barbadian cricketers
North West cricketers
People from Saint Lucy, Barbados